Peter Gertner, also known as Gärtner (born circa 1495/1500; died after 1541 in Nuremberg) was a German painter.

Life 

Peter Gertner received citizenship (burgher rights, Bürgerrecht) of Nuremberg on 12 January 1521, where he presumably learned from the painter Wolf Traut. He became known as a portrait painter and worked for Casimir, Margrave of Brandenburg-Kulmbach in 1527. With Casimir's widow Susanna of Bavaria, after her marriage to Otto Henry, Peter went to the court of Neuburg an der Donau, where he worked as Master Peter, Court Painter (Maister Peter, Hofmaller).

His signature was his monogram pg on a gardener's spade, which is why he is sometimes referred to as "Master PG".

Selected works 

 Portrait of a man (1523); formerly Kurpfälzisches Museum, Heidelberg, stolen in 1974
 Hans Geyer (1524), North Carolina Museum of Art, Raleigh, North Carolina
 Memorial picture of Margrave Casimir and his wife (lost); copy in St. Kilian's Church, Heilbronn
 Susanna of Bavaria (ca. 1530), castle museum in Berchtesgaden
 Portraits of Otto Henry and other members of the House of Wittelsbach (1531 to 1539), most of them in the Bavarian National Museum, Munich
 Philip the Contentious, painted in front of the view of Vienna besieged by the Turks (1530), Bavarian National Museum
 Crucifixion (1537), Walters Art Museum, Baltimore

Literature 
 K. Löcher: Peter Gertner – ein Nürnberger Meister als Hofmaler des Pfalzgrafen Ottheinrich in Neuburg an der Donau. (Neuburger Kollektaneenblatt CXLI) Neuburg an der Donau 1993

References 

German portrait painters
Artists from Nuremberg
16th-century painters